The St. Stephen's College massacre involved a series of war crimes committed by the Imperial Japanese Army on 25 December 1941 during the Japanese occupation of Hong Kong at St Stephen's College.

Incident
Several hours before the British surrendered on Christmas day at the end of the Battle of Hong Kong, Japanese soldiers entered St. Stephen's College, which was being used as a hospital on the front line at the time.  The Japanese were met by two doctors, Black and Witney, who were marched away, and were later found dead and mutilated.  They then burst into the wards and bayoneted a number of British, Canadian and Indian wounded soldiers who were incapable of hiding.  The survivors and their nurses were imprisoned in two rooms upstairs. Later, a second wave of Japanese troops arrived after the fighting had moved further south, away from the school. They removed two Canadians from one of the rooms, and mutilated and killed them outside. Many of the nurses next door were then dragged off to be gang raped, and later found mutilated. The following morning, after the surrender, the Japanese ordered that all these bodies should be cremated just outside the hall. Other soldiers who had died in the defence of Stanley were burned with those killed in the massacre, making well over 100 altogether.

Aftermath
When the college and the grounds of Stanley Prison became a civilian internment camp, the internees gathered up the burnt remains, shards of bones, buttons and charred effects from the cremation, and then buried them. A gravestone marks the spot where these items were interred at Stanley Cemetery.

Lieutenant General Takeo Itō (伊東 武夫), the commander of the 38 Infantry Division during the incident, was held responsible for the atrocity committed by the unit. He was found guilty on the Military Court for the Trial of War Criminals at 1948 and sentenced to twelve years of imprisonment.

References

External links
 St Stephen's college trail 
 (in Chinese) Confession of a Japanese soldier who participated in the cannibalism & rape of medical staff at St Stephen's , September 2012

Massacres in 1941
Japanese occupation of Hong Kong
Japanese war crimes
Massacres committed by Japan
1941 in Hong Kong
Massacres in China
Rape in China
Gang rape in Asia
Second Sino-Japanese War crimes
Wartime sexual violence in World War II
December 1941 events
Battle of Hong Kong
School massacres in Asia
Murder in Hong Kong
Attacks on schools in China
Mass Murder in Hong Kong